Territorial Assembly elections were held in French Togoland on 12 June 1955. The Togolese Party of Progress and the Union of Chiefs and Peoples of the North both won 15 of the 30 seats. The Committee of Togolese Unity boycotted the elections.

Results

References

Elections in Togo
Togo
Assembly election
French Togoland Territorial Assembly election